The DAR 3 Garvan ('Raven' or 'Laz-3') was a 1930s Bulgarian single-engine, multipurpose reconnaissance and auxiliary aircraft.

Design and development 
The aircraft was a multipurpose close air support biplane developed by the Drjavna Aeroplane Rаbotilnitsa. It was intended to be a short-range reconnaissance/light bomber. The first prototype was powered by a 400 hp (298 kW) Lorraine-Dietrich 12D engine. During its early stages, the DAR 3(I) prototype suffered various modifications. Its maiden flight occurred in 1927 and it was delivered in 1928. In 1930 it was fitted with a Gnome et Rhône Jupiter 9Akx radial engine. The second prototype came shortly after: the first prototype's rudder and fin were enlarged and its undercarriage was revised. A second aircraft known as the DAR 3(I bis.), referred to as the third prototype, was built. It featured an American Wright Cyclone engine and triangular pointed fin and was delivered in 1929.

Operational history 
During the 1930s and 1940s, the DAR 3 was used for reconnaissance, army co-operation, liaison and continuation training. The DAR 3 also saw action over the Balkans in 1944. After the crash of two Garvan-III aircraft, the Bulgarian Air Force handed the 10 remaining planes to the Yugoslavian Air Force.

Variants 

 DAR 3(I)
 First and second prototypes.
 DAR 3(I bis.)
 Third prototype modified with Wright Cyclone engine and triangular pointed fin.
 DAR 3 Garvan-I
 Series 1 aircraft with open cockpit and one Wright Cyclone engine in a Townsend ring.
 DAR 3 Garvan-II
 Series 2 aircraft with open cockpit, wheel spats and one Siemens Jupiter VI engine, which was later retrofitted with the Alfa Romeo 126 RC34 engine and a hooded cockpit.
 DAR 3 Garvan-III
 Series 3 aircraft powered by one Alfa Romeo 126 RC34 engine in longer cowling. Featured a cockpit canopy for the pilot but not for the gunner and a lengthened fuselage.

Operators 

 Bulgarian Air Force

 Yugoslavian Air Force

Specifications (DAR 3 Garvan-III)

References 

Reconnaissance aircraft
Aircraft first flown in 1926
Biplanes
Single-engined tractor aircraft